4587 Rees, provisional designation , is a Mars-crosser and former near-Earth object on an eccentric orbit from the asteroid belt, approximately  in diameter. It was discovered during the second Palomar–Leiden Trojan survey on 30 September 1973, by Dutch astronomer couple Ingrid and Cornelis van Houten at Leiden, and Tom Gehrels at the Palomar Observatory in California. The assumed S-type asteroid has a rotation period of 7.9 hours and is likely elongated in shape. It was named after British astrophysicist Martin Rees.

Orbit and classification 

Rees is a Mars-crossing asteroid, a dynamically unstable group between the main belt and the near-Earth populations, crossing the orbit of Mars at 1.66 AU. It orbits the Sun at a distance of 1.31–4.01 AU once every 4 years and 4 months (1,583 days; semi-major axis of 2.66 AU). Its orbit has a high eccentricity of 0.51 and an inclination of 25° with respect to the ecliptic.

Former near-Earth object 

Before 2014, Rees has been a near-Earth object of the Amor group, as its perihelion was slightly less than 1.3 AU due to the body's osculating orbit.

Close approaches 

In July 2072, Rees will pass  from Mars, the closest since it passed  from the Red Planet on 28 January 1843. The asteroid will also pass  from the second largest asteroid, 4 Vesta, on 30 January 2121.

Palomar–Leiden Trojan survey 

The survey designation "T-2" stands for the second Palomar–Leiden Trojan survey, named after the fruitful collaboration of the Palomar and Leiden Observatory in the 1960s and 1970s. Gehrels used Palomar's Samuel Oschin telescope (also known as the 48-inch Schmidt Telescope), and shipped the photographic plates to Ingrid and Cornelis van Houten at Leiden Observatory where astrometry was carried out. The trio are credited with the discovery of several thousand asteroid discoveries.

Naming 

This minor planet was named after Martin Rees (born 1942), a much awarded English cosmologist and astrophysicist who has studied the galactic evolution. Rees became Astronomer Royal and President of the Royal Society in 1995 and 2005, respectively. He is also the director of the Institute of Astronomy and a professor of astronomy at the University of Cambridge.

Physical characteristics 

Rees is an assumed, stony S-type asteroid. Other sources published by EARN assume an Sr-subtype that transitions from the S-type to the rare R-type asteroids.

Rotation period 

In May 2016, a rotational lightcurve of Rees was obtained from photometric observations by Robert Stephens at the Center for Solar System Studies in California. Lightcurve analysis gave a well-defined rotation period of  hours with a brightness variation of 0.55 magnitude, indicative of an elongated, non-spheroidal shape. The result confirms previous observations by Czech astronomer Petr Pravec (7.7886 h) and by astronomers at the Palomar Transient Factory (7.790 h) from April 2003 and October 2012, respectively.

Diameter and albedo 

The Collaborative Asteroid Lightcurve Link assumes a standard albedo for an S-type asteroid of 0.20 and calculates a diameter of 2.03 kilometers based on an absolute magnitude of 15.87.

Notes

References

External links 
 Asteroid 4587 Rees, Small Bodies Data Ferret
 Dictionary of Minor Planet Names, Google books
 Discovery Circumstances: Numbered Minor Planets (1)-(5000) – Minor Planet Center
 
 

004587
004587
Discoveries by Cornelis Johannes van Houten
Discoveries by Ingrid van Houten-Groeneveld
Discoveries by Tom Gehrels
3239
Named minor planets
6378
19730930